Erythrolamprus andinus is a species of snake in the family Colubridae. The species is found in  Bolivia and Peru.

References

Erythrolamprus
Reptiles of Bolivia
Reptiles of Peru
Reptiles described in 1983
Taxa named by James R. Dixon